Margaret Cochran Corbin (November 12, 1751January 16, 1800) was a woman who fought in the American Revolutionary War. On November 16, 1776, her husband, John Corbin, was one of some 600 American soldiers defending Fort Washington in northern Manhattan from 4,000 attacking Hessian troops under British command.  Margaret, too nervous to let her husband go into battle alone, decided she wanted to go with him.  Since she was a nurse, she was allowed to accompany her husband as a nurse for injured soldiers. John Corbin was on the crew of one of two cannons the defenders deployed; when he fell in action, Margaret Corbin took his place and continued to work the cannon until she too was seriously wounded.  It is said that Corbin was standing next to her husband when he fell during battle.  Immediately, she took his post, and because she had watched her husband, a trained artilleryman, fire the cannon so much, she was able to fire, clean and aim the cannon with great ease and speed.  This impressed the other soldiers and was the beginning of her military career.  She later became the first woman in U.S. history to receive a pension from Congress for military service when she could no longer work due to injury, and was enlisted into the Corps of Invalids.

Early life
Margaret Cochran was born in Western Pennsylvania on November 12, 1751, in what is now Franklin County. The surname Cochran is of Irish origin anglicized from maccogaráin or Ó Cogaráin. Her parents were Robert Cochran, an Irish immigrant and his wife, Sarah. In 1756, when Margaret was five years old, her parents were attacked by Native Americans. Her father was killed, and her mother was kidnapped, never to be seen again — Margaret and her brother, John, escaped the raid because they were not at home. Margaret lived with her uncle for the rest of her childhood.

In 1772, at the age of 21, Margaret married a Virginia farmer named John Corbin.

American Revolutionary War

When the war began, John enlisted in the First Company of Pennsylvania Artillery as a matross, an artilleryman who was one of the members of a cannon crew.  As was common at the time for wives of soldiers, Margaret became a camp follower, accompanying John during his enlistment.  She joined many other wives in cooking, washing, and caring for the wounded soldiers.  She acquired the nickname "Molly Pitcher" (as did many other women who served in the war) by bringing water during fighting, both for thirsty soldiers and to cool overheated cannons.

On November 16, 1776, Fort Washington, where John's company was part of the garrison left behind when General George Washington retreated with the Continental Army to White Plains, New York, was attacked by the British.  John Corbin was in charge of firing a small cannon at the top of a ridge, today known as Bennett Park.  During an assault by the Hessians, John was killed, leaving his cannon unmanned. Margaret had been with her husband on the battlefield the entire time, and, after witnessing his death, she immediately took his place at the cannon, continuing to fire until her arm, chest, and jaw were hit by enemy fire.  The British ultimately won the Battle of Fort Washington, resulting in the surrender of Margaret and her comrades and the taking of the last American position in New York City.  As the equivalent of a wounded soldier, Margaret was released by the British on parole.

After the Battle of Fort Washington
After the battle, Margaret went to Philadelphia, completely disabled from her wound, and never fully healed. Life was difficult for her because of her injury, and in 1779 she received aid from the government. On June 29, the Executive Council of Pennsylvania granted her $30 to cover her present needs, and passed her case on to Congress's Board of War. On July 6, 1779, the Board, sympathetic to Margaret's injuries and impressed with her service and bravery, granted her half the monthly pay of a soldier in the Continental Army and a new set of clothes or its equivalent in cash. With this act, Congress made Margaret the first woman in the United States to receive a military pension from Congress.

After Congress's decision, Margaret was included on military rolls until the end of the war.  She was enrolled in the Corps of Invalids, created by Congress for wounded soldiers. In 1781, the Corps of Invalids became part of the garrison at West Point, New York. She was discharged from the Continental Army in 1783. There is a historical marker near her monument at West Point.

Later years
Corbin received financial support from the government after the war, the first woman to do so.  She died on January 16, 1800, at the age of 48, in Highland Falls, New York, where the local historical society erected a historical marker - to Captain Molly, in her honor.

Legacy
A memorial commemorating her heroism was erected in 1909 near the scene of her service on the C. K. G. Billings Estate, in what would later become New York City's Fort Tryon Park. In addition, after the park was constructed, "Margaret Corbin Circle" lies just outside the main entrance, and "Margaret Corbin Drive" connects the circle through the park to the Henry Hudson Parkway.  A plaque honoring Corbin, placed by the Chamber of Commerce of Washington Heights in 1982, is located on the eastern of the two stone plynths which mark the start of Margaret Corbin Drive. A large Art Deco mural depicting the Battle of Fort Washington scene decorates the lobby of a nearby apartment building at 720 Fort Washington Avenue.  According to the New York Historical Association, Corbin was "honored as no woman of the revolution has ever been honored before."

In 1926, The New York State Chapter of the Daughters of the American Revolution (DAR) verified Margaret's records and recognized her heroism and service to the United States through the papers of General Henry Knox. Remains believed to be hers were exhumed and re-interred with full military honors at the cemetery of the United States Military Academy at West Point behind the Old Cadet Chapel in the West Point Cemetery. The Margaret Corbin Monument was erected by the DAR at the gravesite. However, a 2017 archeological study revealed that the remains that had been moved were not those of Corbin, but rather an unknown male. The location of Corbin's remains is unknown.

See also
 Deborah Sampson, a woman who fought in the Revolutionary War, but disguised as a man
 Anna Maria Lane, a Virginia woman who fought, dressed as a man, alongside her husband in the Revolutionary War
 Sally St. Clair, a South Carolina woman who fought in the Revolutionary War and was killed during the Siege of Savannah
 Mary Ludwig Hays, a woman who fought in the Battle of Monmouth
 Molly Pitcher, who may have been Corbin or Hays

Further reading
Bohrer, Melissa Lukeman. Glory, Passion, and Principle: The Story of Eight Remarkable Women at the Core of the American Revolution. New York: Atria Books, 2003.   
Downey, Fairfax. 1956. "The Girls Behind the Guns". American Heritage. 8, no. 1: 46–48.
Holm, Jeanne. Women in the Military: An Unfinished Revolution. Novato, CA: Presidio Press, 1992.  
Raphael, Ray. Founding Myths: Stories That Hide Our Patriotic Past. New York: New Press, 2004.  
Teipe, E. J. 1999. "Will the Real Molly Pitcher Please Stand Up?" PROLOGUE -WASHINGTON-. 31: 119–127.

References
Bibliography

External links

Biography of Margaret Corbin
Michals, Debra.  "Margaret Cochran Corbin."  National Women's History Museum.  2015.

1751 births
1800 deaths
18th-century American women
People from Franklin County, Pennsylvania
People of colonial Pennsylvania
People of New York (state) in the American Revolution
Women in the American Revolution
Continental Army soldiers
Burials at West Point Cemetery
Women in the United States military